The rivière des Couture (in English: Couture River) is a tributary of the east bank of the rivière à la Scie which flows west to the south bank of the St. Lawrence River. This watercourse flows entirely within the territory of the city of Lévis, in the administrative region of Chaudière-Appalaches, in Québec, in Canada.

Toponymy 
The toponym “Rivière des Couture” was made official on March 28, 1974, at the Commission de toponymie du Québec.

See also 

 List of rivers of Quebec

References 

Rivers of Chaudière-Appalaches
Lévis, Quebec